Jannie de Beer is a former international lawn and indoor bowls competitor for South Africa.

Bowls career
In 1996 she won the gold medal in the triples and a silver medal in the fours at the 1996 World Outdoor Bowls Championship in Adelaide.

The following year she won the fours gold medal at the Atlantic Bowls Championships in Llandrindod Wells with Barbara Redshaw, 
Lorna Trigwell and Hester Bekker.

She plays for the Centurion Bowling Club in Gauteng North.

References

Year of birth missing (living people)
Living people
South African female bowls players
Bowls World Champions